IBH may refer to:
 India Book House
 International Briquettes Holding
 Institute for Better Health
 Individual Bali Hospitality